Fadlo R. Khuri, is the 16th and current president of the American University of Beirut. He assumed office in September 2015 and was inaugurated on January 25, 2016. Khuri was also a professor in the Department of Hematology and Medical Oncology at Emory University School of Medicine and was the editor-in-chief of the medical journal Cancer.

Khuri was formerly executive associate dean of research and chair of the Department of Hematology and Medical Oncology at Emory University's School of Medicine. He also served as deputy director of the Winship Cancer Institute of Emory University.

On March 15, 2019 the Board of Trustees announced the renewal of Khuri as AUB President for a second five-year term as AUB President, effective September 1, 2020.

References

External links
Profile at Google Scholar

American oncologists
American University of Beirut
American University of Beirut trustees
Living people
Medical journal editors
Yale University alumni
Columbia University Vagelos College of Physicians and Surgeons alumni
Cancer researchers
American people of Lebanese descent
Fellows of the American Association for the Advancement of Science
Year of birth missing (living people)
Emory University School of Medicine faculty